Janusz is a pejorative term for a person displaying negative stereotypical traits of a Pole.

Janusz is usually depicted as a middle-aged mustachioed man, most often wearing a white undershirt (usually on the shoulder straps), wearing white socks and sandals, with a large belly, often carrying a discount bag. Janusz's entertainment includes drinking beer and watching TV. He is often depicted as quarrelsome and quick to inform on his neighbors. Janusz is also often depicted with the head of a proboscis monkey.

Janusz's stereotypical partner is Grażyna, who is unintelligent, likes shopping and is interested in gossip. Both Janusz and Grażyna self-importantly speak about topics they are ill-equipped to discuss, and do not understand the basics of cultural behavior.

The term may also refer to an ignorant person in a broader sense, such as "business Janusz",  a person trying to maximize short-term benefits, a negative stereotype of Polish entrepreneurs.

See also 

 Polandball
 Karen (slang)
 Vatnik (slang)

Notes

References 

Internet memes
Sociology of culture
Stereotypes of Polish people
Pejorative terms for European people